Niccolò Lazzari was an Italian film editor. He worked on more than thirty films between 1940 and 1966, including Vittorio De Sica's neorealist Shoeshine (1946). He worked on a number of films directed by Carmine Gallone.

Partial filmography
 Eternal Melodies (1940)
 Love Me, Alfredo! (1940)
 First Love (1941)
 The Two Orphans (1942)
 Odessa in Flames (1942)
 Sad Loves (1943)
 Shoeshine (1946)
 Before Him All Rome Trembled (1946)
 The Lady of the Camellias (1947)
 The Legend of Faust (1949)
 Night Taxi (1950)
 The Force of Destiny (1950)
 Messalina (1951)
 We're Dancing on the Rainbow (1952)
 Neapolitan Carousel (1954)
 Madame Butterfly (1954)
 House of Ricordi (1954)
 Tosca (1956)
 Altair (1956)
 Damon and Pythias (1962)

References

Bibliography
 Bizio, Silvia & Laffranchi, Claudia. Cinema Italian style: Italians at the Academy Awards. Gremese, 2002.

External links 
 

Year of birth unknown
Year of death unknown
Italian film editors